A wakf (plural awqaf ), also called a ḥabs (plural ḥubūs  or aḥbās ), or mortmain property, is an inalienable charitable endowment under Islamic law. It typically involves donating a building, plot of land or other assets for Muslim religious or charitable purposes with no intention of reclaiming the assets. A charitable trust may hold the donated assets. The person making such dedication is known as a waqif (a donor). In Ottoman Turkish law, and later under the British Mandate of Palestine, a waqf was defined as usufruct state land (or property) from which the state revenues are assured to pious foundations.

Terminology

In Sunni jurisprudence, waqf, also spelled wakf (plural , awqāf) is synonymous with ḥabs (also called ḥubs  or ḥubus  and commonly rendered habous in French). Habs and similar terms are used mainly by Maliki jurists. In Twelver Shiism, ḥabs is a particular type of waqf, in which the founder reserves the right to dispose of the waqf property. The person making the grant is called al-waqif (or al-muhabbis) while the endowed assets are called al-mawquf (or al-muhabbas).

In older English-language law-related works in the late 19th/early 20th centuries, the word used for waqf was vakouf; The word, also present in such French works, was used during the time of the Ottoman Empire, and is from the Turkish vakıf.

Definition
The term waqf literally means "confinement and prohibition" or causing a thing to stop or stand still.

Bahaeddin Yediyıldız defines the waqf as a system which comprises three elements: hayrat, akarat and waqf. Hayrat, the plural form of hayr, means “goodnesses” and refers to the motivational factor behind vakıf organization; akarat refers to corpus and literally means ”real estates” implying revenue-generating sources, such as markets (bedestens, arastas, hans, etc.), land, baths; and waqf, in its narrow sense, is the institution(s) providing services as committed in the vakıf deed such as madrasas, public kitchens (imarets), karwansarays, mosques, libraries, etc.

Generally, the waqf must fulfill three primary constraints:
 The one endowing the waqf, and its subsequent maintainers should sequester the principal and allocate the proceeds to charity
 The endowment should legally be removed from commodification such that it is no longer on the market
 Its sole purpose must be charitable and the beneficiary group must be named.

Origin in Islamic texts
Although there is no direct Quranic injunction regarding the Waqf, their conception in Islamic society has been derived from a number of hadiths. It is said that during the time of Muhammad, after the Hijrah, the first waqf was composed of a grove of 600 date palms. The proceeds of this waqf were meant to feed Medina's poor.

In one tradition, it said that: "Ibn Umar reported, Umar Ibn Al-Khattab got land in Khaybar, so he came to Muhammad and asked him to advise him about it. Muhammad said, 'If you like, make the property inalienable and give the profit from it to charity.'" It goes on to say that Umar gave it away as alms, that the land itself would not be sold, inherited or donated. He gave it away for the poor, the relatives, the slaves, the jihad, the travelers and the guests. And it will not be held against him who administers it if he consumes some of its yield in an appropriate manner or feeds a friend who does not enrich himself by means of it.

In another hadith, Muhammad said, "When a man dies, only three deeds will survive him: continuing alms, profitable knowledge and a child praying for him."

Life cycle

Founding
Islamic law puts several legal conditions on the process of establishing a waqf.

Founder
A waqf is a contract, therefore the founder (called al-wāqif or al-muḥabbis in Arabic) must be of the capacity to enter into a contract. For this the founder must:
be an adult
be sound of mind
capable of handling financial affairs
not under interdiction for bankruptcy

Although waqf is an Islamic institution, being a Muslim is not required to establish a waqf, and dhimmis may establish a waqf. Finally if a person is fatally ill, the waqf is subject to the same restrictions as a will in Islam.

Women's contribution to the waqf system
A widely unknown fact about the demographic of founders of Ottoman waqfs is that many of them were women; with the existence of their establishments having a crucial impact on their communities’ economic life. Out of 30,000 waqf certificates documented by the GDPFA (General Directorate of Pious Foundation in Ankara), over 2,300 of them were registered to institutions that belonged to women. And of the 491 public fountains in Istanbul that were constructed during the Ottoman period and survived until the 1930s, nearly 30% of them were registered under waqfs that belonged to women.

Property
The property (called al-mawqūf or al-muḥabbas) used to found a waqf must be objects of a valid contract. The objects should not themselves be haram (e.g. wine or pork). These objects should not already be in the public domain: public property cannot be used to establish a waqf. The founder cannot also have pledged the property previously to someone else. These conditions are generally true for contracts in Islam.

The property dedicated to waqf is generally immovable, such as estate. All movable goods can also form waqf, according to most Islamic jurists. The Hanafis, however, also allow most movable goods to be dedicated to a waqf with some restrictions. Some jurists have argued that even gold and silver (or other currency) can be designated as waqf.

Beneficiaries
The beneficiaries of the waqf can be persons and public utilities. The founder can specify which persons are eligible for benefit (such the founder's family, entire community, only the poor, travelers). Public utilities such as mosques, schools, bridges, graveyards and drinking fountains can be the beneficiaries of a waqf. Modern legislation divides the waqf as "charitable causes", in which the beneficiaries are the public or the poor, and "family" waqf, in which the founder makes the beneficiaries his relatives. There can also be multiple beneficiaries. For example, the founder may stipulate that half the proceeds go to his family, while the other half go to the poor.

Valid beneficiaries must satisfy the following conditions:
 They must be identifiable. At least some of the beneficiaries must also exist at the time of the founding of the waqf. The Mālikīs, however, hold that a waqf may exist for some time without beneficiaries, whence the proceeds accumulate are given to beneficiaries once they come into existence. An example of a non-existent beneficiary is an unborn child.
The beneficiaries must not be at war with the Muslims. Scholars stress that non-Muslim citizens of the Islamic state (dhimmi) can definitely be beneficiaries.
The beneficiaries may not use the waqf for a purpose in contradiction of Islamic principles.

There is dispute over whether the founder himself can reserve exclusive rights to use waqf. Most scholars agree that once the waqf is founded, it can't be taken back.

The Ḥanafīs hold that the list of beneficiaries include a perpetual element; the waqf must specify its beneficiaries in case.

Declaration of founding
The declaration of founding is usually a written document, accompanied by a verbal declaration, though neither are required by most scholars. Whatever the declaration, most scholars (those of the Hanafi, Shafi'i, some of the Hanbali and the Imami Shi'a schools) hold that it is not binding and irrevocable until actually delivered to the beneficiaries or put in their use. Once in their use, however, the waqf becomes an institution in its own right.

Administration

Usually a waqf has a range of beneficiaries. Thus, the founder makes arrangements beforehand by appointing an administrator (called nāẓir or mutawallī or ḳayyim) and lays down the rules for appointing successive administrators. The founder may himself choose to administer the waqf during his lifetime. In some cases, however, the number of beneficiaries are quite limited. Thus, there is no need for an administrator, and the beneficiaries themselves can take care of the waqf.

The administrator, like other persons of responsibility under Islamic law, must have capacity to act and contract. In addition, trustworthiness and administration skills are required. Some scholars require that the administrator of this Islamic religious institution be a Muslim, though the Hanafis drop this requirement.

Extinction
Waqf is intended to be perpetual and last forever. Nevertheless, Islamic law envisages conditions under which the waqf may be terminated:
If the goods of the waqf are destroyed or damaged. Scholars interpret this as the case where goods are no longer used in the manner intended by the founder. The remains of the goods are to revert to the founder or his/her heirs. Other scholars, however, hold that all possibilities must be examined to see if the goods of the waqf can be used at all, exhausting all methods of exploitation before the termination.  Thus, land, according to such jurists, can never become extinguished.
A waḳf can be declared null and void by the ḳāḍī, or religious judge, if its formation includes committing acts otherwise illegal in Islam, or it does not satisfy the conditions of validity, or if it is against the notion of philanthropy. Since waqf is an Islamic institution it becomes void if the founder converts to another religion.
According to the Mālikī school of thought, the termination of the waqf may be specified in its founding declaration. As the waqf would expire whenever its termination conditions are fulfilled (e.g. the last beneficiary). The waqf property then reverts to the founder or to his/her heirs.

History and location

The practices attributed to Muhammad have promoted the institution of waqf from the earliest part of Islamic history.

The two oldest known waqfiya (deed) documents are from the 9th century, while a third one dates from the early 10th century, all three within the Abbasid Period. The oldest dated waqfiya goes back to 876 CE and concerns a multi-volume edition of the Qur'an currently held by the Turkish and Islamic Arts Museum in Istanbul. A possibly older waqfiya is a papyrus held by the Louvre Museum in Paris, with no written date but considered to be from the mid-9th century. The next oldest document is a marble tablet whose inscription bears the Islamic date equivalent to 913 CE and states the waqf status of an inn, but is in itself not the original deed; it is held at the Eretz Israel Museum in Tel Aviv.

Jerusalem

In the 16th century, the Haseki Sultan charitable complex was founded by the wife of Suleyman the Magnificent and serviced 26 villages; the institution also included shops, a bazaar, two soap plants, 11 flour mills and two bathhouses located in Palestine and Lebanon. For several centuries, the income generated by these businesses contributed in the maintenance of a mosque, a soup kitchen, and two traveler and pilgrim inns.

Egypt
The earliest pious foundations in Egypt were charitable gifts, and not in the form of a waqf. The first mosque built by 'Amr ibn al-'As is an example of this: the land was donated by Qaysaba bin Kulthum, and the mosque's expenses were then paid by the Bayt al-mal. The earliest known waqf, founded by financial official Abū Bakr Muḥammad bin Ali al-Madhara'i in 919 (during the Abbasid period), is a pond called Birkat Ḥabash together with its surrounding orchards, whose revenue was to be used to operate a hydraulic complex and feed the poor.

India
Early references to Wakf in India can be found in the 14th-century work Insha-i-Mahru by Aynul Mulk Ibn Mahru. According to the book, Sultan Muizuddin Sam Ghaor dedicated two villages in favor of Jama Masjid, Multan, and, handed its administration to the Shaikhul Islam (highest ecclesiastical officer of the Empire). In the coming years, several more wakfs were created, as the Delhi Sultanate flourished.

As per the Wakf Act 1954 (later Wakf Act 1995) enacted by the government of India, Wakfs are categorized as (a) Wakf by user such as Graveyards, Musafir Khanas (Sarai) and Chowltries etc., (b) Wakf under Mashrutul-khidmat (Service Inam) such as Khazi service, Nirkhi service, Pesh Imam service and Khateeb service etc., and (c) Wakf Alal-aulad is dedicated by the Donor (Wakif) for the benefit of their kith and kin and for any purpose recognised by Muslim law as pious, religious or charitable. After the enactment Wakf Act 1954, the Union government directed to all the states governments to implement the Act for administering the wakf institutions like mosques, graveyards, anjumans and various religious and charitable institutions. A statutory body under Government of India, which also oversees State Wakf Boards. In turn the State Wakf Boards work towards management, regulation and protect the Wakf properties by constituting District Wakf Committees, Mandal Wakf Committees and Committees for the individual Wakf Institutions. As per the report of Sachar Committee (2006) there are about 500,000 registered Wakfs with  land in India, and Rs. 60 billion book value.

Other
The waqf institutions were not popular in all parts of the Muslim world. In West Africa, very few examples of the institution can be found, and were usually limited to the area around Timbuktu and Djenné in Massina Empire. Instead, Islamic west African societies placed a much greater emphasis on non-permanent acts of charity. According to expert Illife, this can be explained by West Africa's tradition of "personal largesse." The imam would make himself the collector and distributor of charity, thus building his personal prestige.

According to Hamas, all of historic Palestine is an Islamic waqf. This is, however, a myth.

In Southeastern Europe, there are several places in Bosnia and Herzegovina that were originally built under the waqf system, such as Gornji Vakuf, and Donji Vakuf.

Funding of schools and hospitals

After the Islamic waqf law and madrassah foundations were firmly established by the 10th century, the number of Bimaristan hospitals multiplied throughout Islamic lands. By the 11th century, many Islamic cities had several hospitals. The waqf trust institutions funded the hospitals for various expenses, including the wages of doctors, ophthalmologists, surgeons, chemists, pharmacists, domestics and all other staff, the purchase of foods and medicines; hospital equipment such as beds, mattresses, bowls and perfumes; and repairs to buildings. The waqf trusts also funded medical schools, and their revenues covered various expenses such as their maintenance and the payment of teachers and students.

From the more peculiar examples of healthcare-related waqfs, in the city of Tripoli, a man had set up a waqf which employed two people who would "walk through the hospitals every day and speak quietly to one another in the patients' hearing, remarking on their improvement and good colour".

Comparisons with trust law
The waqf in Islamic law, which developed in the medieval Islamic world from the 7th to 9th centuries, bears a notable resemblance to the English trust law. Every waqf was required to have a waqif (founder), mutawillis (trustee), qadi (judge) and beneficiaries. Under both a waqf and a trust, "property is reserved, and its usufruct appropriated, for the benefit of specific individuals, or for a general charitable purpose; the corpus becomes inalienable; estates for life in favor of successive beneficiaries can be created" and "without regard to the law of inheritance or the rights of the heirs; and continuity is secured by the successive appointment of trustees or mutawillis."

The only significant distinction between the Islamic waqf and English trust was "the express or implied reversion of the waqf to charitable purposes when its specific object has ceased to exist", though this difference only applied to the waqf ahli (Islamic family trust) rather than the waqf khairi (devoted to a charitable purpose from its inception). Another difference was the English vesting of "legal estate" over the trust property in the trustee, though the "trustee was still bound to administer that property for the benefit of the beneficiaries." In this sense, the "role of the English trustee therefore does not differ significantly from that of the mutawalli."

Personal trust law developed in England at the time of the Crusades, during the 12th and 13th centuries. The Court of Chancery, under the principles of equity, enforced the rights of absentee Crusaders who had made temporary assignments of their lands to caretakers.  It has been speculated that this development may have been influenced by the waqf institutions in the Middle East.

See also
Jerusalem Islamic Waqf
Charitable trust
Islamic economic jurisprudence
Islamic economics in the world
Private foundation
Trust law
Zakah
Waqf of Ibshir Mustafa Pasha Complex
 Agencies
AWQAF Africa
Haryana Waqf Board (India)
Ministry of Awqaf (Egypt)
Ministry of Evkaf (Ottoman Empire)
Office of the Waqf Administrator (Bangladesh)

References

Further reading

 Real property, mortgage and wakf according to Ottoman law, by D. Gatteschi. Pub. Wyman & Sons, 1884.
 Waqf in Central Asia: four hundred years in the history of a Muslim shrine, 1480–1889, by R. D. McChesney. Princeton University Press, 1991. .
 Wakf administration in India: a socio-legal study, by Khalid Rashid. Vikas Pub., 1978. .
 ′′Le vakif – un aspect de la structure socio-économique de l'Empire Оttoman (XV-e - XVIII-e s.)′′, by Vera Moutaftchieva. Sofia-Press, 1981
 ′′Inventory of Ottoman Turkish documents about waqf preserved in the Oriental Department at the St. St. Cyril and Methodius National Library. Part 1- Registers′′, by Evgeni Radushev, Svetlana Ivanova, Rumen Kovachev, Rossitsa Gradeva, Vera Mutafchieva. Sofia, IMIR, 2003.  http://veramutafchieva.net/pdf/198.pdf   
 ′′Agrarian Relations in the Ottoman Empire in the 15th and 16th Centuries′′, by Vera P. Mutafchieva. New York, Columbia Univ. Press (East European monographs; CCLI) 1988.

External links

 , Muslim Philanthropy Digital Library, an open-source Library managed by the research program at the John D. Gerhart Center for Philanthropy and Civic Engagement at the American University in Cairo
 Islamic Law of waqf according to Five Islamic schools of jurisprudence 
 Islamic Law According to Five schools of jurisprudence 
 Islamic law concerning waqf (Public Trust) 
 Encyclopaedia of the Orient article on waqf
 The Hoda Center in Gainesville, FL is also known (lovingly) as "The Waqf"
 Es Seyyid Osman Hulûsi Efendi Waqf in Darende, in Turkiye.
 Kuwait Awqaf Public Foundation
 Waqfuna موقع " وقفنا "
 Huge properties, little earnings: What ails the Waqf Boards in India?

Islamic terminology
Islam in India
Sharia
Philanthropy
Ottoman law
Charity law
Mandatory Palestine in World War II
Legal entities